Priverno is a town, comune in the province of Latina, Lazio, central Italy. It was called Piperno until 1927.

It has a station of the Rome-Naples railway mainline. Nearby is the Monti Lepini chain. It was the birthplace of the canonist Reginald of Piperno.

History 

Privernum is described by Livy as a flourishing Volscian site, which was conquered and destroyed by the Romans in the late 4th century BC. The Appian Way passed nearby.  The town recovered under the Roman rule, but disappeared after the fall of the Western Roman Empire, probably destroyed by Saracen attacks.

It was later a minor center of the Papal States, to which it belonged until the capture of Rome in 1870.

Main sights 

Nearby is the Abbey of Fossanova, which is where the town's patron saint, St. Thomas Aquinas died on 7 March 1274. 
 
Other churches include:
Santa Maria Assunta (former Cathedral), consecrated by Pope Lucius II in 1183. It houses a panel of the Madonna d'Agosto and St. Thomas's skull.
San Benedetto, built by the Benedictines from the 7th century AD; it includes 13th and 16th centuries frescoes
San Giovanni Evangelista (c. 9th century, rebuilt in the 13th century). It has 13th-15th century frescoes, including stories of St. Catherine (14th century), a Madonna with Child (15th century)
San Tommaso d'Aquino (13th century)
San Nicola (13th century)

Lay buildings include the Villa Gallio, a residence of Cardinal Bartolomeo Gallio, the Communal Palace (13th century), with the Dolphin Fountain by Giuseppe Olivieri and the Porta San Marco and Porta Posterola, the only remains of the seven gates once giving access to Priverno. Remains of the old Privernum are outside the town, including parts of the walls, baths, three patrician houses and a temple. Here a colossal statue of Tiberius (now in the Vatican Museum) was found in the late 18th century.

References

External links
 Official website

Cities and towns in Lazio